LEN European Junior Water Polo Championship is a continental water polo tournament held every two years for the players under the age of 17.

Men's tournament

History

1983 Istanbul, Turkey

1985 Valletta, Malta

1987 Athens, Greece

1991 cancelled

1993 Veenendaal, Netherlands

1995 Esslingen, Germany

1997 Maribor, Slovenia

1999 Sofia, Bulgaria

Medal table

Women's tournament

History

Medal table

Results History
 https://www.the-sports.org/water-polo-men-s-european-u-17-junior-championships-statistics-sups4120.html

References

LEN water polo competitions
International water polo competitions
Waterpolo
Under-17 sport